Croesoactia is a genus of tachinid flies in the family Tachinidae.

Species
Croesoactia cincta Townsend, 1927

Distribution
Peru.

References

Diptera of South America
Exoristinae
Tachinidae genera
Taxa named by Charles Henry Tyler Townsend